The Gloucester Skating Club is a non-profit skating club in Ottawa, Ontario, Canada. The club has been serving skaters since 1971. The club is currently one of the sixth largest clubs in Canada with an active membership of more than 1,100 skaters. The club may be best known as the home club of 1988 Olympic silver medallist Elizabeth Manley who returned to coach with the club in 2007.

The club offers a wide variety of skating programs including CanSkate, Competitive Stream, Test Stream, Synchronized, Dance, Pairs and Teen-Adult programs. The professional coaching staff includes and has included national, world and Olympic medalists, such as former world champion Jeffrey Buttle. In 2016, director and coach Sheilagh McCaskill was awarded an Ottawa Sports Award lifetime achievement award.

The Elizabeth Manley skating rink at the Bob MacQuarrie Orléans Recreation Complex (formerly Orléans Recreation Complex) is named for Manley who trained there and who won a silver medal in women's figure skating at the 1988 Calgary Winter Olympics. It is home to the Gloucester Skating Club and the Canadian Academy of Skating Arts, a program started by Canadian Hall of Fame coach, Peter Dunfield.

Notable skaters
Figure skaters who have trained at the club include:
 Elizabeth Manley, 1988 Olympic silver medalist
 Angela Derochie, 1998 Canadian national champion
 Yuka Sato, 1994 World champion
 Stefanie Partridge, 1998 Canadian Jr. silver medalist and international competitor
 Matthew MacMurdo, 1997 Canadian Winter Games champion
 Mark Butt, 2000 US National Collegiate medalist

References

1971 establishments in Ontario
Figure skating clubs in Canada
Sport in Ottawa
Sports clubs established in 1971